The ancient Japanese practice of , lit. "viewing the realm", involved climbing a mountain to survey the land, often before praising it in song. It also often uses spatial elements and metaphors to affirm prosperity and power of a ruler. It is documented in the early chronicles the Kojiki and Nihon Shoki as well as in a number of poems in the Man'yōshū.

Origins
Close association with the Imperial House may suggest that kunimi was an agricultural rite imported from China; alternatively it may have been a folk practice. The "blood relationship" between emperor and land gives kunimi added significance.

The earliest documented occurrence was in 663 BC, when Emperor Jimmu ascended a mountain in Uda and spotted 80 bandits on Kunimi Hill. He is advised by the kami to subdue them by gathering clay from Mount Kagu and creating from it sacred vessels for propitiatory sacrifice accompanied by incantation. In 630 Jimmu himself ascended the hill of Wakigami no Hohoma no Oka, viewed the land, and observed:
"Oh! what a beautiful country we have become possessed of! Though a blessed land of inner-tree-fibre, yet it resembles a dragonfly licking its hinder parts".

The imperial excursions of Emperor Ōjin and Emperor Yūryaku also led to kunimi.

Examples 
There are a number of kunimi uta or land-viewing poems

Man'yōshū 1: 2 by Emperor Jomei: 

This land-praising poem is composed by the emperor Jomei. The origin of "Dragonfly" refers to Japan according to the mythological first Emperor of japan, Jimmu

Kojiki song # 41 by Emperor Ōjin

In the poem/songs above, the emperor Ojin stood on Uji field and praise the land on the trip to Chikatu Omi (the province around Lake Biwa).

Nihonshoki song # 77 by Emperor Yūryaku

In the song above,  when Emperor Yūryaku made an excursion to that field, he named the place the fields of Michi with an upsurge of emotion.

See also
 Yamato Sanzan
 Ascent of Mount Ventoux

References

Japanese culture
History of mountaineering
Mountaineering in Japan